Bellona was an ancient Roman goddess of war. Her main attribute is the military helmet worn on her head; she often holds a sword, spear, or shield, and brandishes a torch or whip as she rides into battle in a four-horse chariot. She had many temples throughout the Roman Empire. She is known for her temple outside of Rome being the official decision making centre in regards to war and for her bloodlust and madness in battle. Her iconography was extended by painters and sculptors following the Renaissance.

Etymology 
The name of the goddess of war Bellōna stems from an earlier Duellona, itself a derivative of Old Latin duellum ('war, warfare'), which likewise turned into bellum in Classical Latin.

The etymology of duellum remains obscure. Linguist Georges-Jean Pinault has proposed a derivation from *duenelo- ('quite good, quite brave'), a reconstructed diminutive of the word duenos, attested on an eponymous inscription as an early Old Latin antecedent of the word bonus ('good'). According to linguist Michiel de Vaan, the use of *duenelo- "in the context of war (bella acta, bella gesta) could be understood as a euphemism, ultimately yielding a meaning 'action of valour, war' for the noun bellum."

Cult, beliefs, and temples
Bellona was originally an ancient Sabine goddess of war identified with Nerio, the consort of the war god Mars, and later with the Greek war goddess Enyo. Her temple in Rome was dedicated in 296 BCE near the Circus Flaminius by Appius Claudius Caecus, during the war with the Etruscans and Samnites. This temple was the first location to have decorative shields dedicated to mortals hung in a holy place. Appius Claudius hung the shields and dedicated them to his family.

Her festival was celebrated on 3 June, and her priests were known as Bellonarii and used to wound their own arms or legs as a blood sacrifice to her. These rites took place on 24 March, called the day of blood (dies sanguinis), after the ceremony. In consequence of this practice, which approximated to the rites dedicated to Cybele in Asia Minor, both Enyo and Bellona became identified with her Cappadocian aspect, Ma.

The Roman Campus Martius area, in which Bellona’s temple was situated, had extraterritorial status. Ambassadors from foreign states, who were not allowed to enter the city proper, stayed in this complex. Since the area of the temple was outside the pomerium, the Senate met there with ambassadors and received victorious generals prior to their triumphs. Beside the temple was the war column (columna bellica), which represented non-Roman territory. To declare war on a distant state, a javelin was thrown over the column by one of the priests concerned with diplomacy (fetiales) in a modification of the archaic practice, from Roman territory toward the direction of the enemy land and this symbolical attack was considered the opening of war. The first enemy declared in this fashion was Pyrrhus in 280 BC.

There were many people willing to assist in the upkeep and improvement of her temples and shrines. In addition, they were also willing to incur the cost upon themselves. Because she was widely believed to be a volatile goddess, she was rarely worshipped openly and most of her worshippers preferred to quietly assuage her. Despite their subtlety, evidence of her worship can be found throughout Rome. At least seven inscriptions that are affiliated with the worship of Bellona have been found. An early inscription in the Forum of Augustus harkens back to the time of the war with Pyrrhus. Five of the inscriptions are found around the Aedem Bellonae (a shrine of Bellona's) and the other two inscriptions are damaged. The worship of her was not limited to Rome, however. Bellona had a temple as far north as York, England, where the church of St. Peter currently stands.

The worship of Bellona and beliefs about her were often gory or frightening. It was believed that when she went to war, Discordia, Strife, and the Furies would accompany her and terrify her enemies. The belief in her bloodlust and madness in battle is widely accepted and is one of the more prevalent beliefs. According to Ammianus Marcellinus, the Scordici people believed in the violent worship of Bellona. They were brutal and they worshipped both Mars and Bellona with savagery. They would offer up human sacrifices and drink blood from the skulls of their victims.

In the military cult of Bellona, she was associated with Virtus, the personification of valour. She then travelled outside Rome with the imperial legions and her temples have been recorded in France, Germany, Britain, and North Africa.

Representation in the arts

Poetry
Often in poetry, the name Bellona is used simply as a synonym for war, although in the Thebaid of Statius the goddess appears as a character, representing the destructive and belligerent aspect of war. There she is described as carrying a spear and a flaming torch or riding in a chariot and waving a blood-stained sword. Classical allusions to Bellona later appear in Shakespeare's plays in the appropriate context of warrior characters: Hotspur describes the goddess as "the fire-eyed maid of smoky war", for example, and Macbeth is referred to as "Bellona's bridegroom", that is to say, the equivalent of Mars.

In more modern times, Adam Lindsay Gordon dedicated an energetic Swinburnean evocation of the "false goddess" who leads men astray in his poem "Bellona", published in Australia in 1867. She also figures in Arthur Graeme West's World War I poem "The Traveller". There the poet describes himself as marching toward the front line in the company of Art, the god Pan, and the works of Walter Pater. Meeting Bellona as they approach the fighting, one by one the pleasurable companions are forced to flee before the violence of war, until the goddess rejoices in having him to herself.

Cantata and opera
Bellona appears in the prologue of Rameau's opera, Les Indes Galantes (1735), in which the call of love ultimately triumphs over that of war. In a Bach dramma per musica performed two years before, Tönet, ihr Pauken! Erschallet, Trompeten! BWV 214, the goddess even puts aside her usual ferocity in order to congratulate Maria Josepha of Austria, Princess Elector of Saxony and Queen of Poland, on her birthday on 8 December 1733.

She retains her harsh aspect in "Prometheus Absolved" by Giovanni Ambrogio Migliavacca (1718–1795), however. In this cantata celebrating the birth of the Archduchess Isabella in 1762, the deities sit in judgement on Prometheus, some arguing for clemency, while Bellona and others demand rigour. She also plays her proper part in the 'heroic cantata' created by the composer Francesco Bianchi and the librettist Lorenzo da Ponte, entitled "The Wedding of the Thames and Bellona" (Le nozze del Tamigi e Bellona). This was performed in London to mark the British naval victory over the Spanish at the Battle of Cape St. Vincent (1797).

Painting and sculpture

Bellona is commonly portrayed wearing a plumed helmet and dressed in armour, or at least a breastplate with a skirt beneath. In her hand she carries a spear, shield, or other weapons, and occasionally, she sounds a trumpet for the attack. Anciently, she was associated with the winged Victory, holding a laurel crown in her hand, a statue of whom she sometimes carries; when she appears on war memorials she may hold that attribute.

Examples of such an armoured figure appear in the 1633 painting attributed to Rembrandt in the Metropolitan Museum of Art, and statues by Johann Baptist Straub (1770) and Johann Wilhelm Beyer (1773–80). In the latter, she appears with the god Janus, since both were associated with the Roman ceremonies of declaring war. In the case of Janus, the doors to his temple were left open during the whole period of hostilities.

Straub's statue (below) has a gorgon head on her shield to instil terror in her enemies, as does the Rembrandt painting, although this was added later, probably as a response to other examples of this new iconographical departure.  In the bust by Bertram Mackennal she wears a gorgon mounted on her helmet, while in other depictions it is on the breastplate. Jean-Léon Gérôme takes the representation of the horror of war even further in his glazed bust of the goddess (1892). Not only is she wearing a head about her neck, but the fierce demeanour of the screaming face, surmounted by an angular winged helmet, makes her resemble a gorgon herself.

Another common innovation was Bellona’s association with cannons, as in the drawing by Hans Krieg (1590–1645)  and the 1700 ceiling fresco at Hammerschloss Schmidmühlen by Hans Georg Asam (1649–1711). An early Dutch engraving in a series of prints depicting Personifications of Industrial and Professional Life suggests that it is this goddess who inspires the invention of war materiels, showing her seated in a factory workshop with all manner of arms at her feet (plate 6, see the Gallery below). In the fresco by Constantino Brumidi in the U.S. Capitol (1855–60), her image is updated. There she is shown standing next to an artillery piece and has the stars and stripes on her shield.

Not all representations of Bellona wear armour. The statues by Alvise Tagliapietra at St. Petersburg (c.1710) and that at the J. Paul Getty Museum by Augustin Pajou (1775/85)  are largely naked, although otherwise wearing or carrying some of the other attributes of the goddess. There are Classical references that sanction this, however. In Gaius Valerius Flaccus' Argonautica, for example, appears the description "Bellona with bare flank, her brazen weapons clanging as she moved" (3. 60). A further poetic reference taken up by a painter occurs in Louis Jean François Lagrenée's "Bellona Presenting the Reins of his Horses to Mars" (1766). This illustrates a speech from Claudian's In Ruffinum where Mars requests "Let Bellona bring my helmet and Terror guide the reins" (Fer galleam Bellona mihi, nexusque rotarum tende Pavor). Jan van Mieris’ allegorical painting of "Wisdom restraining Bellona" (1685) is also poetic. There the seated figure of Wisdom clasps the right hand of the helmeted goddess, who is turning to leave, her cloak fluttering behind her and her shield held high in her outstretched left hand.

Public statements
As well as having a decorative function, representations of the goddess had a public function too. Batholomaeus Spranger's "Bellona Leading the Imperial Armies against the Turks" (see above) played its part in Austria's anti-Turkish propaganda during the Long Turkish War. A later phase of the continuing conflict, culminating in victory at the battle of Zenta in 1697, is marked by Jean Cosyn's celebratory doorway in Brussels in what now is known as the Maison de Bellone, at the centre of which presides the helmeted bust of the goddess surrounded by military standards and cannons.

A dynastic political statement is made in "Marie de Medici as Bellona" (1622/5), designed by Peter Paul Rubens for her public rooms in the Luxembourg Palace. He represents her there as a wielder of political power at a time when it, in fact, had waned. She is standing with armour, cannons, and muskets at her feet, and her triumphs are underlined by emblems of victory. She carries a small statue of the winged goddess in her right hand, a smaller winged figure is mounted below the plumes of her helmet, while cupids hover above her, holding a laurel crown. Her portrayal contrasts with Rembrandt's depiction of Bellona with the homely features of an ordinary Dutchwoman. This makes an anti-imperial statement, with the assurance that the new Dutch Republic is ready to defend itself, particularly against Spain, during the Thirty Years' War.

Auguste Rodin's sculpture of a head of Bellona (1879) originally was created for a monument to the French Third Republic and shows even more belligerence. Modelled on his mistress Rose Beuret while in a bad mood, the head is drawn back in proud anger, turning in dynamic movement to look along the line of her right shoulder. Defence in war is the message of Georg Kolbe's Bellona fountain in Wuppertal. Originally commissioned in 1915, it depicted the helmeted goddess carrying a sword in her left hand and inspiring a kneeling young man. The statue was not erected until 1922, by which time it functioned as a war memorial.

The use of Bellona in such structures was well established before this, dating back to her prominent use in Jean Cosyn's doorway. The Temple of Bellona, designed by William Chambers for Kew Gardens in 1760, was projected as a celebration of the Anglo-Hanoverian war effort during the Seven Years' War and eventually housed plaques honouring the regiments that served in it. These, however, related primarily to remembrance of victory rather than of the fallen. It was not until a century afterward that the French-Canadian victims of the Seven Years War were commemorated by a monument at Quebec. Atop a tall column on the site of the battlefield, Bellona looks down, carrying a shield and laurel crown in her right hand. The statue was presented by Jérôme-Napoléon in 1862 as a gesture of reconciliation.

The Australian dead from the Gallipoli Campaign were commemorated by a bronze bust of Bellona by Bertram Mackennal, a former student of Rodin. This he presented to the Australian government in Canberra as a memorial in 1916. As in Rodin's bust, the helmeted head is turned to the right, but the breasts are more in evidence. The fallen generally make their appearance later in such structures where Bellona is present. They accompany the sword-wielding goddess in Douglas Tilden's monument to the California Volunteers during the Spanish–American War of 1898; in the Bialystok memorial to the dead in the Polish–Soviet War in 1920, she stands behind a soldier and holds aloft a laurel crown.

The Bellona on the First World War victory archway at Waterloo station is particularly memorable, however. Beneath the demonic sword-brandishing wraith with her gorgon necklace, cower and mourn, not the dead, but the overlooked living victims of war.

Gallery

References

Bibliography

External links

 Images of Bellona in the Warburg Institute Iconographic Database

Roman goddesses
War goddesses